Improv for the People (IFTP) is an improvisational theatre studio based in Los Angeles, California. Matthew Moore founded IFTP in 2009. Before Moore founded Improv for the People, he studied improvational theatre and comedy in Los Angeles. IFTP moved to their current location in Culver City in 2012. IFTP offers courses ranging from advanced improv to beginners seeking to improve their communication skills and confidence through Improv. Moore also leads corporate workshops through Improv for the People. Galyn Görg studied at Improv for the People.

See also
List of improvisational theatre companies
List of improvisational theater festivals

References

External links 

Improv for the People with Matthew Moore via YouTube

Improvisational theatre
Theatre companies in Los Angeles
Companies based in Culver City, California